Galdakao is a town and municipality located in the province of Biscay, in the autonomous community of Basque Country, northern Spain.

It is located in the Greater Bilbao, in the valley of the Ibaizabal river, near the Ganguren mountain range. It is surrounded by some summits such as Arrezurriaga (329 m), Txispamendi (221 m) and Santa María (476 m) in the north and Upo (556 m) and Mandoia (640 m) in the south.

It is coterminous with Zamudio, Lezama and Larrabetzu in the north, with Zaratamo and Zeberio in the south, with Amorebieta, Lemona and Bedia in the east and with Etxebarri and Basauri in the west.

Neighbourhoods

 Aperribai
 Arteta
 Bekea
 Bengoetxe
 Berezikoetxe
 Elexalde
 Erletxe
 Olabarrieta-Txistulanda
 Urreta
 Usansolo
 Tximelarre Bekoa
 Tximelarre Goikoa
 Muguru
 Zabalea

References

External links
 GALDAKAO in the Bernardo Estornés Lasa - Auñamendi Encyclopedia (Euskomedia Fundazioa) 
  Official website

Municipalities in Biscay
Estuary of Bilbao